Irina-Camelia Begu and Sara Errani were the defending champions, but Errani is serving a doping suspension. Begu played alongside Barbora Krejčíková, but they lost in the quarterfinals to Han Xinyun and Darija Jurak.

Nicole Melichar and Květa Peschke won the title, defeating Monique Adamczak and Jessica Moore in the final, 6–4, 6–2.

Seeds

Draw

Draw

References
Main Draw

Tianjin Open - Doubles
Tianjin Open